Muhammad Fadhel al-Jamali (April 20, 1903 – May 24, 1997) was an Iraqi politician, Iraqi foreign minister, and prime minister of Iraq from 1953 to 1954. In 1945, al-Jamali, as Iraqi Minister of Foreign Affairs, signed the United Nations Charter on behalf of his country.

Early life

Al-Jamali was born in Kadhimain, near Baghdad, the son of a Shi'a cleric, Sheikh Abbas Al-Jamali. His early education was a religious one, attending the religious seminary of Sheikh Al-Khalisi. After graduating from the American University in Beirut, and Teachers College of Columbia University in New York City, he taught for some time in Iraq before entering public life.

In 1944 he joined the Iraqi Ministry of Foreign Affairs. Later he served as Director General of Education. Although he was a Shi'a Muslim, he promoted harmony and educational equality with the minority Sunni Muslims. Also, His marriage to his American-Canadian wife, Sara Powell was in accordance with the Sunni doctrine.

Prime Minister of Iraq
He was a member of both houses of the old Iraqi Parliament, and was 8 times Foreign Minister, and between 1953 and 1954 he served twice as Prime Minister. He was twice the president of the Chamber of Deputies between October 1950 and September 1953.

Because of the communist threat from the Soviet Union along Iraq's northeastern border, he advocated for a strong affiliation with the United States and the United Kingdom, at a time when the United States of America seemed to be a good ally for the Arab world against communism, but he later confessed his disappointment at the way America treated his country, the Arab world and the problems in the middle east in general.

After the Iraqi monarchy was overthrown, the Revolutionary Military Tribunal of 1958 sentenced him to death, but this was later commuted to 10 years' imprisonment; he was released in 1961 after serving three years. His release came after the demands of many important international figures.

Writings
While in prison he wrote a series of letters to his son setting out the teaching and practice of Islam and its relevance to the problems and experience of the modern world. Following his release from prison, he compiled those letters into a book Letters on Islam.

The book's topics are: man's need for religious faith; the Qur'an as guidance; the significant of fasting; science and faith; the nature of religious experience; the meaning of Islam; science, philosophy and religion; the Islamic creed; Islamic rituals; the social system of Islam (legislation, the family, characteristics, economic principles, social, and government); and morality in Islam.

In the book al-Jamali detailed his beliefs: "My faith calls for scientific research, especially in the field of natural science and social studies and the acceptance of the concept of evolution. "I believe in the freedom of thought, and my faith in it is deep, provided it is associated with intellectual honesty."

University career
During the 1960s through the 1980s, he taught as Professor of Philosophy of Education, at the University of Tunis. There he was able to spread the Islamic beliefs that he had developed in several books.

Following the overthrow of Saddam Hussein in 2003, al-Jamali's writings became more popular throughout Iraq. His books appealed to the Iraqis: urged Muslims to comply with the Qur'an, but appealed to them to study modern science to keep apace with the West.

Marriage
In 1932, Al-Jamali was married to Sarah Powell (February 22, 1908—March 3, 2000), who was born in Saskatchewan, Canada to American parents. They met while studying at the Teachers College of Columbia University in the late 1920s. She moved to Iraq with Fadhel and they had three sons: Laith, Usameh, and Abbas. At a young age Laith was stricken with encephalitis, which arrested his mental development. From her experience in caring for Laith, Sarah promoted public awareness of mental retardation and wrote a book of her movement: The Story of Laith and His Life After Encephalitis.  She also wrote Folktales from the City of the Golden Dome, a compilation of Iraqi folktales.

Also known as Mohammad Fadhil Jamali and Mohammed Fadhil Jamali.

Bibliography
Harry Almond, "Iraqi Statesman: A Portrait of Mohammad Fadhel Jamali".
Sara P. Jamali, Folktales from the City of the Golden Dome.
Mohammad Fadhel Jamali, Letters on Islam, Oxford University Press, London, 1965.
Alan Rush, "Obituary Mohammad Fadhel Jamali", The Independent (London), June 3, 1997.
Charis Waddy, "Obituary Sarah Parker Jamali", The Independent (London), March 27, 2000.
Sarah P. Jamali, The Story of Laith and His Life after Encephalitis, Amman, 2000.
Mohammad Fadhel Jamali, "Experiences in Arab Affairs: 1943-1958"  available on the Internet at

Teachers College, Columbia University alumni
Prime Ministers of Iraq
Presidents of the Chamber of Deputies of Iraq
1903 births
1997 deaths
Iraqi Shia Muslims
Academic staff of Tunis University
American University of Beirut alumni
Foreign ministers of Iraq
Anti-communism in Iraq